FC Tolyatti was a Russian football club from Tolyatti, founded in 2008. Most of the players on the 2008 roster came from FC Krylia Sovetov-SOK Dimitrovgrad 2007 roster, and the club actually plays their home games in Dimitrovgrad. In March 2010, the club was excluded from the Second Division, (as was another Tolyatti team, FC Lada Tolyatti at the time). FC Lada Tolyatti is still functioning however, while Tolyatti is now also represented by FC Akademiya Tolyatti.

See also 
Konoplyov football academy

External links
Official Website

References

Association football clubs established in 2008
Association football clubs disestablished in 2010
Defunct football clubs in Russia
Sport in Tolyatti
2008 establishments in Russia
2010 disestablishments in Russia